Sophie Bongers (born ), better known by her stage name Sophie Francis, is a Dutch record producer, DJ and musician.

Biography

Early life
Sophie was born on 2 December 1998 in 's-Hertogenbosch, Netherlands but she used to live in St Francis Bay, South Africa, for a big part of her childhood. She moved to Sint-Oedenrode, Netherlands later with her parents. From an early age, she had an interest in music. By the age of 9, she started playing piano and singing along to many songs. At the age of 14, she had to do a school project at the International School of Eindhoven (ISE) where she should develop a new skill during 9 months, and being so much into the music, she got inspired to do something with it for this project. Besides that, she also wanted to do something with people. When doing research she found a video of a DJ playing a live set who had a great connection with the crowd. As she loved the vibe and was amazed by how one person can transfer his energy to an entire crowd with music, she realized that "when you are a DJ, you have this special connection with people, I think that's amazing!". She went to a music school in Eindhoven, where she began taking DJ lessons and met new friends who already began producing music, kicking off her career two years before her graduation, achieved on 19 May 2017.

Music career
Her first residency was at a small bar Het Pumpke in her hometown of Sint-Oedenrode, when she was only 15 years old. Since then, she was regularly invited to perform at various events in the Netherlands. She began her career under the stage name "Sophie's Choice". In the summer of 2015, she signed with Always Management. She also performed at BCM in Mallorca. In October, due to a trademark conflict, she changed her stage name to "Sophie Francis" as a tribute to St Francis Bay, a town in South Africa where she grew up. In late November, she was invited to South Africa for a tour, where she performed main-stage at The Ruins Festival in St Francis Bay and The Coco Club in Cape Town, as well as an appearance on national television. One day, she noticed that John Christian was announcing a new record label that supports new talents. Afterwards, she caught the attention of Christian by sending some demos, and the two began working together to release Sophie's music on Christian's record label Freeway Recordings.

2016 
On 29 February 2016 she released "Drop of a Dime", her first single on Freeway Recordings,  followed by her second single "Up in This", which was described by EDMTunes as "a mainstage-ready banger" that "proves why the likes of Ummet Ozcan and Quintino have already thrown her support".

Her third single titled "Bad Boy" was released on 20 June, and later on she released the track "Annihilate" as a free download, which received over 2 million plays on SoundCloud.

During summer she also performed main-stage at festivals across the Netherlands and Spain, such as Paellas Universitarias for 35,000 people in Valencia, as well as a concert residency at BCM Mallorca as 'New Discovery' special guest, playing once a week for two months before main guests like Steve Aoki, Nervo, Vinai and Martin Garrix with whom she performed as well a back-to-back.

On 23 September she released her first vocal track "Walls" on Powerhouse Music. The track entered the playlists of Dutch national radio stations such as Radio 538, SLAM! and NPO 3FM, reached the Top 30 on the Dutch Airplay chart, as well as became a Dance Smash on 538 and received 94% of likes from 538 listeners on the item 'Maak 't of kraak 't' (Make it or break it).

In October, she performed at the Amsterdam Dance Event for the first time, playing on a bus, touring the Dutch capital as well as she was a guest at Giel on NPO 3FM.

On 9 November she was a guest and performed at Bij Igmar on SLAM!. That same month, she released "Don't Stop" on Dirty Dutch Music. In December, she performed at the Glazen Huis in Breda.

By the end of 2016, Sophie Francis is an in-demand artist getting booking requests from the UK, Belgium, France, Germany, US, India, China, Vietnam, Japan and UAE, but balancing the fact that she is still a high school student, working daily to find a balance between her career and her studies.

2017 
On 30 January Sophie Francis signed a deal with renowned dance label  Spinnin' Records, which she said was "a dream coming true". She released her first single with them on 17 February: "Without You" which she created together with The Companions. The track was very well received and played by artists such as Tiësto, Nicky Romero, Dimitri Vegas & Like Mike and is being played on radio stations worldwide.

She has been named on Spotify's "Top 25 Most Influential Artists Under 25" alongside artists such as Martin Garrix and Oliver Heldens, among others. On 2 March 2017 she was a guest and performed at De Avondploeg on Radio 538. She later performed during the "Miami Winter Music Conference" at the Spinnin' Hotel in South Beach and on 25 March she performed for the first time at Ultra Music Festival in Miami, Florida on the "Worldwide" stage.

On 27 April 2017 she performed at AFAS Stadion in Alkmaar during SLAM! Koningsdag 2017. Less than a month later, she released her second single on Spinnin' Records,  "Lovedrunk". A poppy track with some urban influences, first announced as an ID track and supported by The Chainsmokers, Dimiti Vegas & Like Mike, R3hab and VINAI among others. The single peaked at number 17 on the DMC Buzz Chart two weeks before release. An official music video for the song was released. A remix pack for the song was released less than three months later, featuring remixes from Olly James, Carta and TV Noise. She had also hosted an episode on the label's radio show Spinnin' Sessions.

During summer she performed at various festivals in the Netherlands, and the Amsterdam Arena during the Glamour Health Challenge. In July she performed at the 2017 edition of the Tomorrowland festival for two days in Belgium.

In August her first Asia tour took off, touching Myanmar, Thailand, Indonesia, Japan and China. A month later she went back to China to perform at Storm Music Festival in Changsha and Shanghai, before heading back to the Netherlands to attend her second ADE, performing 3 times during the week in Amsterdam.

In October she started her own radio show, named "Beyond Radio", broadcast weekly by a French and Belgian radio station and on WolfBytes Radio in the United States. Every episode, lasting one hour, contains mashups, previews and news about Sophie's career.

On 10 November her new single "Get over it" was out on the label "Smash the house", celebrated with a release party at the Veltins-Arena in Gelsenkirchen.

Her third Asia tour started with a DJ-set on board of a cruise-ship called "It's the ship", boarding from Singapore and traveling around Asian countries. Other stops of the tour were clubs in Shanghai, Ningbo, Jakarta, and Tokyo, where she also celebrated her 19th birthday on 2 December before getting back to Europe.

2017 ended with two DJ-sets in her second home, South Africa, playing in Cape Town at "Soundscape" on 30 December and at "Secrets of Summer" for New Year's Eve.

2018 

Her 10th release was out on 26 January. "Hearts of gold" is produced on Spinnin' records and contains the vocal feature of Nicole Bus. On the same day, Sophie's first official remix is released by Atlantic Records and is the rework of Sam Bruno's "So what".

In late February she played at a charity event in Eindhoven organized by Rodekruis, the Dutch Red Cross, giving her contribution to raise 24.000 € for the kids of Haiti.

On 9 March the long-awaited vocal version of "Get over it" was released on Smash the house with the voice of Laurell.

Discography

Charting singles

Singles

 29-02-2016: "Drop Of A Dime" [Freeway Recordings]
 11-04-2016: "Up In This" [Freeway Recordings]
 30-05-2016: "Bad Boy" [Freeway Recordings]
 20-06-2016: "Annihilate" [FREE]
 26-09-2016: "Walls" [Powerhouse Music]
 18-11-2016: "Don't Stop" [Dirty Dutch Music]
 17-02-2017: "Without You" [Spinnin' Records]
 26-05-2017: "Lovedrunk" [Spinnin' Records]
 10-11-2017: "Get over it" [Smash the House]
 26-01-2018: "Hearts Of Gold" [Spinnin' Records]
 09-03-2018: "Get over it" Ft. Laurell [Smash the house]
 30-06-2018: "Stay Up" [Spinnin' Records]
 05-10-2018: "Weekend Love" [Spinnin' Records]
 28-02-2019: "True Champion" [FREE]
 29-03-2019: "Lose My Mind" [Spinnin' Records]
 10-05-2019: "On My Way" [Spinnin' Records]
 04-10-2019: "Six Pack" [Future House Music]
 02-21-2020: "Roll Up" [Heldeep Records]
 04-27-2020: "A-FREAK-A" [Spinnin' Records]

Remixes 
 26-01-2018: Sam Bruno - So what [Atlantic records]

Awards and nominations 
Spotify: "Top 25 Most Influential Artists Under 25"

Notes
 A  "Without You" did not enter the Ultratop 50, but peaked at number 13 on the Flemish Dance Bubbling Under chart.
 B  "Without You" did not enter the Ultratop 50, but peaked at number 19 on the Walloon Dance Bubbling Under chart.

References

External links
 

1998 births
Dutch dance musicians
Dutch house musicians
Dutch DJs
Dutch record producers
Women DJs
Living people
People from 's-Hertogenbosch
People from Sint-Oedenrode
Spinnin' Records artists
Electro house musicians
Progressive house musicians
Future bass musicians
Electronic dance music DJs
21st-century women musicians
Dutch women record producers
Women in electronic music